The Spanish Cultural Heritage Institute (IPCE) is the institution of the Ministry of Culture and Sports dedicated to the research, conservation and documentation of our heritage.

In order to develop this work, the IPCE counts with specialists in various disciplines: architects, archaeologists, ethnographers, conservators, scientists, archivists, computer specialists and curators, among others. These professionals face their work from the necessary multidisciplinary perspective, demanded by the complex task of conserving and valorizing cultural property.

Functions 

The Institute carries out the following functions:

 Development and implementation of conservation plans of movable and immovable Spanish Cultural Property.
 Setting up of main lines of research in heritage conservation criteria, methodology and techniques.
 Filing and systematizing the work carried out by the Institute.
 Training of specialists who attend the functions of the Institute. 

Conservation, research, training and diffusion are the basis of the IPCE structure. It is based on the solid track record of its predecessor, the Spanish Historical Heritage Institute, responding to a dynamic collaboration with local and autonomous Administrations. All this is upgraded by the constant contact between international professionals and institutions.

IPCE Functional Areas

Conservation 

One of the main functions of the Spanish Cultural Heritage Institute (IPCE) is the conservation of our heritage legacy.

The Institute develops many projects and activities on all types of heritage: monumental architecture, works of art, archaeological objects, textiles, bibliographic and documentary heritage, etc.

The IPCE also coordinates the generation and implementation of the National Cultural Heritage Plans, joint management tools for different types of cultural goods. Their drafting involves professionals of the Central Government, Autonomous Communities and independent experts. 

A National Plan sets the criteria and develops methods to protect, preserve, investigate, document and transmit cultural heritage. 

Currently there are thirteen National Cultural Heritage Plans for the following matters: Cathedrals, abbeys, monasteries and convents; defensive architecture; industrial heritage; cultural landscapes; research in heritage conservation; preventive conservation; intangible heritage; twentieth  century heritage; education and heritage; traditional architecture; conservation of photographic heritage; and emergencies in heritage.

Research 

Research should be the leitmotif of any conservation intervention and valorisation of cultural heritage. On this premise, the Institute specialists develop research in different areas: heritage applied sciences, conservation, architecture, archaeology, art history, ethnology and documentation.

Training 

The quality of the interventions developed by the managerial and technical stall, responsible for heritage protection, depends on their complete and updated training. The IPCE is aware of the need to develop a training policy,keeping with national and international criteria in the heritage field. We, therefore, run various training activities, such as courses, conferences, technical seminars, etc.

Documentation 

The ample documentary, bibliographic and photographic archives of the IPCE require constant conservation and valorisation. Thus the information stored in the Archive, the Library and Photo Library of the Institute contributes to increase constantly the knowledge of Spanish Cultural Heritage.

Diffusion 

The functions carried out by the Institute, mainly those related to research, conservation and diffusion of cultural goods, demand an active communications policy addressed to government, public and private institutions. Among other initiatives, this diffusion policy brings about a yearly publication plan that includes scientific monographs and magazines - "Patrimonio Cultural de España" and "Informes y Trabajos"-.

IPCE Internal Organization

Conservation Intervention Area 

The main functions of this area are the design, management and implementation of conservation interventions in cultural property, the draft and management of National Heritage Plans and the promotion of architectural, archaeological, historical and ethnographic research. 

The area develops the following works:

 Conservation of cultural property. 
 Advice on conservation projects of Autonomous Communities and other public or private institutions. 
 Draft and management of National Heritage Plans.
 Technical reports about projects applying for finance through 1% Cultural (1% of the budget for civil works is spent on art projects). 
 Ethnographic research and implementation of projects.
 Management of the Finance Program for the International Archaeological Projects, developed by the Ministry of Culture and Sports. 
 Drafting of documents on intervention criteria, methodology and action protocol in cultural property.
 Reports on loan agreements and condition reports for exhibitions promoted by public institutions. 
 Coordination of European Heritage Days.

Research and Training Area 

The general functions are the development, application and research of experimental sciences in conservation of cultural heritage. 

The lines of works are:

 Advice on the selection of methods and materials preparation used in cultural property treatments.
 Selection of methodology and analysis techniques. Standardization and equipment start up.
 Sampling and analyzing. 
 Study of original and added materials in cultural property.
 Design of analytical methods that contribute to the diagnosis of the cultural property condition.
 Setting environmental conditions of storage, display and transportation of cultural property.
 Study of environmental and biological deterioration agents.
 IPCE Training Program design and management.

Documentation and Diffusion Area 

The main duties are:

 Conservation, management and valorisation of cultural heritage documents kept in our archives.
 Management of our specialized Cultural Heritage Library.
 Research, preservation and diffusion of our Heritage Photo Library. 
 Development, coordination and centralization of information produced by the Institute activities.
 Attending information requests of the Ministry of Culture and Sports and other institutions, as well as the diffusion of the work generated by the Institute activities.
 Publication management.
 Exhibition organization.
 Guided tours of the Institute and monuments during their conservation processes.
 Coordination of web space and IPCE profile in social networks.

Headquarters

The headquarters of the Cultural Heritage Institute of Spain (Spanish: Instituto del Patrimonio Cultural de España) are located in Madrid, Spain. They were declared Bien de Interés Cultural in 2001.

Building was projected in 1967 by architects Fernando Higueras and Antonio Miró Valverde, and built from 1967 to 1970.

References

External links

 

 Presentation of the Spanish Cultural Heritage Institute 

 Official website 

Buildings and structures in Ciudad Universitaria neighborhood, Madrid
Bien de Interés Cultural landmarks in Madrid
Buildings and structures completed in 1970